Musnad al-Shafi'i, is one of the famous Hadith book attributed to Imam Abū ʿAbdullāh Muhammad ibn Idrīs Al-Shafi‘i   (767–820 CE, 150–204 AH). Shah Abd Al-Aziz Ad-Dehlawi writes “This Musnad is used to designate the marfū’ hadīth which ash-Shāfi’ī related to his companions. Those of them which reached Abul-'Abbas Muhammad ibn Ya’qūb al-Asamm from what he heard from Rabi' ibn Sulaymān of the Kitāb al-Umm and al-Mabsūt were collected by him in one place; he called it the Musnad ash-Shāfi’ī.

Description
The book contains almost two thousand (2000) hadiths according to Maktaba Shamila. It is one of the oldest Musnad ( a kind of Hadith book) written. It is written in second century of Islamic Calendar and written before the most authentic book of Hadiths (narrations of the Islamic prophet, Muhammad) that are Sahihain (Sahih al-Bukhari & Sahih Muslim). The Musnad (مسند) are collections of Hadiths which are classified by narrators, and therefore by Sahabas (companions of Muhammad). It seems that the collection is not directly the work of the Imam, but rather it was written by later scholars who were students of al-Rabi', the inheritor of al-Shafi'i as ibn Hajar al-'Asqalani explains. 

Shah Abd Al-Azīz Ad-Dehlawi writes “Rabi' Ibn Sulaymān kept the company of ash-Shāfi’ī, took from him, and listened to all but four hadīth from the first section which al-Buwayti related from ash-Shafi’ī.

A man from Nishapur called Muhammad Ibn Matar collected this Musnad; selecting it from the chapters of al-Umm and al- Mabsut by ash-Shafi’ī. Since that was at the command of Abu'l-Abbas al-Asamm, some people considered
him the author of this Musnad. It is said that Abu'l-'Abbas selected it and
Muhammad ibn Ja far ibn Matar, the scribe, was only a transmitter.

This Musnad is not arranged in the same order as the Musnads nor is it
arranged in chapters. He collected it without any order or organisation.
There were a lot of repetitions in it.”

Publications
The book has been published by many organizations around the world: 
   Sharh Musnad al-Shafi'i 4 VOLUMES (شرح مسند الشافعي) by Imam Abu al-Qasim al-Rafi'i: Published: Dar al-Nawadir | Syria-Lebanon-Kuwait  
   Musnad al-Imam Muhammad Ibn Idris al-Shafi'i: Published: Dar al-Basha'ir al-Islamiyyah (Beirut, Lebanon)
   Musnad Al-Imam Al-Shafi'i: Published: Gheras Publishing (2004)

See also
 Kitab al-Umm
 Al-Risala (Al-Shafi‘i)
 List of Sunni books
 Musnad Abu Hanifa
 Musnad Ahmad ibn Hanbal
 Muwatta Malik
 Kutub al-Sittah

References

Shafi'i
Sunni literature
Hadith
Hadith collections
Sunni hadith collections
9th-century Arabic books
10th-century Arabic books